is the 30th single by the Japanese band Garnet Crow. It was released on August 19, 2009. The song's melody was created by singer, Nakamura Yuri, with the lyrics written by keyboard player, Azuki Nana. The song is about the lives of flowers, seen from a darker perspective.

A rearranged version of this titular song also appeared on the band's seventh album, Stay: Yoake no Soul. The album's limited edition disc featured another version of the song, titled "Hana wa Saite Tada Yurete: Silent Poet ver.".

It reached number 14 in the Oricon music chart, making it the band's worst-ranked single in three years on the charts.

Track listing
CD single
"Hana wa Saite Tada Yurete" - 4:15
"Ai ni Niteru" - 3:28
"Hana wa Saite Tada Yurete (Instrumental)" - 4:15

CD+DVD single
"Hana wa Saite Tada Yurete" - 4:15
"Ai ni Niteru" - 3:28
"Hana wa Saite Tada Yurete (Instrumental)" - 4:15
"Hana wa Saite Tada Yurete" (Musicvideo) - 4:15
Short music clip from 7th album Stay: Yoake no Soul

Digital download
"Hana wa Saite Tada Yurete" - 4:15
"Ai ni Niteru" - 3:28

Charts and certifications

Charts

Sales and certifications

Usage in media
The song was used as the ending theme for the TV show Uwasa no! Tokyo Magazine.

Release history

References

Garnet Crow songs
2009 singles
2009 songs
Songs with lyrics by Nana Azuki
Giza Studio singles